Progress M-36 was a Russian unmanned Progress cargo spacecraft, which was launched in October 1997 to resupply the Mir space station.

Launch
Progress M-36 launched on 5 October 1997 from the Baikonur Cosmodrome in Kazakhstan. It used a Soyuz-U rocket.

Docking
Progress M-36 docked with the aft port of the Kvant-1 module of Mir on 8 October 1997 at 17:07:09 UTC, and was undocked on 17 December 1997 at 06:01:53 UTC.

Decay
It remained in orbit until 19 December 1997, when it was deorbited. The deorbit burn occurred at 13:20:01 UTC, with the mission ending at 13:59:01 UTC.

See also

 1997 in spaceflight
 List of Progress missions
 List of uncrewed spaceflights to Mir

References

Progress (spacecraft) missions
1997 in Kazakhstan
Spacecraft launched in 1997
Spacecraft which reentered in 1997
Spacecraft launched by Soyuz-U rockets